The 1987 São Paulo FC season details the competitions entered, matches played and teams faced by the São Paulo Futebol Clube in the 1987 season, showing the result in each event. Both friendly and official events are included. São Paulo Futebol Clube is a professional football club based in São Paulo, Brazil. They play in the Campeonato Paulista, São Paulo's state league, and the Campeonato Brasileiro Série A or Brasileirão, Brazil's national league.

Statistics

Scorers

Overall 

{|class="wikitable"
|-
|Games played || 68 (42 Campeonato Paulista, 6 Copa Libertadores, 15 Campeonato Brasileiro, 5 Friendly match)
|-
|Games won || 27 (17 Campeonato Paulista, 1 Copa Libertadores, 7 Campeonato Brasileiro, 2 Friendly match)
|-
|Games drawn || 25 (18 Campeonato Paulista, 2 Copa Libertadores, 3 Campeonato Brasileiro, 2 Friendly match)
|-
|Games lost || 16 (7 Campeonato Paulista, 3 Copa Libertadores, 5 Campeonato Brasileiro, 1 Friendly match)
|-
|Goals scored || 100
|-
|Goals conceded || 74
|-
|Goal difference || +26
|-
|Best result || 4–0 (H) v Ponte Preta - Campeonato Paulista - 1987.04.224–0 (A) v Santo André - Campeonato Paulista - 1987.06.10
|-
|Worst result || 1–3 (A) v Guarani - Copa Libertadores - 1987.03.271–3 (A) v Cobreloa - Copa Libertadores - 1987.06.26
|-
|Top scorer || Müller (26)
|-

Friendlies

Miami Marlboro Cup

Official competitions

Campeonato Paulista

First stage

Matches

Second stage

Matches

Final standings

Semifinals

Finals

Record

Copa Libertadores

Group 3

Matches

Record

Campeonato Brasileiro

Green module

Matches

Second stage

Matches

Final standings

Record

External links
official website 

Brazilian football clubs 1987 season
1987